Samuel Erickson Abakah (born 10 October 1959) is a Ghanaian politician and member of the New Patriotic Party. He is the member of parliament for the Shama Constituency, in the Western Region of Ghana.

Early life and education 
Abakah hails from Abuesi. He is a Barrister.

References 

Ghanaian MPs 2021–2025
Living people
1959 births
New Patriotic Party politicians
People from Western Region (Ghana)